Tony Phelan is an American television screenwriter, producer and director. He is married to television producer and screenwriter Joan Rater.

Phelan is best known for his work on ABC's Grey's Anatomy, for which he has been nominated for two Emmys and three WGA awards, of which he has won one, shared with the writing team members from the show. On Grey's Anatomy, he has produced two dozen episodes, written five and served as co-executive producer for another eighteen. His wife also works on the show, which they joined at the beginning of the second season. They became executive producers and ran the writers room with show creator Shonda Rhimes. They will leave the show after the tenth season has ended as they have sealed a two-year deal with CBS Television Studios.

His other work includes producing and writing for Law & Order: Trial by Jury, and writing for the programs Push, Nevada, Threat Matrix, MDs, Haunting Sarah, Fling, Cover Me and Council of Dads.

References

External links

American television writers
American male television writers
American television producers
American television directors
Living people
Year of birth missing (living people)